Pandar Jan (also romanized as Pandar Jān, Penderjān, Pender John, and Penderjohn) is a village in Hamzehlu Rural District, in the Central District of Khomeyn County, Markazi Province, Iran. At the 2006 census, its population was 67, in 18 families.

References 

Populated places in Khomeyn County